König is the German word for "king". In German and other languages applying the umlaut, the transliterations Koenig and Kœnig, when referring to a surname, also occur. As a surname in English, the use of Koenig is usual, and sometimes also Konig. Notable people with the name include:

People

A to F
Adam Koenig (born 1971), American politician
Adrianus König (1867–1944), Dutch politician
Aislinn Konig
Alexander Koenig (1858–1940), German naturalist
Alexander König (born 1966), German skater
Alfons König (1898–1944), Wehrmacht officer during World War II
Alfred König (1913-1987), Austrian-Turkish Olympic sprinter
Andrew Koenig (1968–2010), American actor
Andrew Koenig (politician) (born 1982), American politician in Missouri
Andrew Koenig (programmer), American computer scientist and author
Anna Leonore König (1771–1854), Swedish singer
Arthur König (1856–1901), German physician and researcher into optics
Bronson Koenig (born 1994), American basketball player
Charles Konig (1774–1851), German-born British naturalist
Claës König (1885–1961), Swedish horse rider
Dave Konig (born 1962), American comedian
Dénes Kőnig (1884–1944), Hungarian mathematician, son of Gyula
Dieter König (1931–1991), hydroplane racer, manufacturer of Konig two stroke engines
Elazar Mordechai Koenig (born 1945), Israeli Hasidic rabbi
Ernst König (1908–1986), Wehrmacht officer during World War II
Erwin König
Eugen König (1896–1985), Wehrmacht officer during World War II
Ezra Koenig (born 1984), American musician, singer/guitarist in Vampire Weekend
Franz König (1905–2004), Cardinal, Archbishop of Vienna
Franz König (surgeon) (1832–1910), German surgeon
Franz Niklaus König (1765–1832), Swiss painter
Franz Koenigs (1881–1941), German-Dutch banker and art collector
Fred Koenig (1931–1993), American baseball player and coach
Friedrich Koenig (1774–1833), German inventor
Friedrich König (painter) (1857–1941), Austrian artist
Friedrich Eduard König (1846–1936), German Protestant theologian and Semitic scholar
Fritz Koenig (1924–2017), German artist and sculptor

G to M
Gabriela König (born 1952), German politician
Gedaliah Aharon Koenig, Israeli Hasidic rabbi
George Konig (1856–1913), American politician
Gottfried Michael Koenig (1926–2021), German-Dutch composer
Gyula Kőnig (1849–1913), also known as Julius König, Hungarian mathematician
Harold G. Koenig, American psychiatrist
Herbert D. Koenig (1933-2018), Doctor of Osteopathy 
Imre König (1899–1992), Hungarian chess master
Jan Latham-Koenig (born 1953), English conductor
Jared Koenig (born 1994), American baseball player
Jörn König (born 1967), German politician
Johann König (painter) (1586–1642), German painter
Johann Friedrich König (1619–1664), German Lutheran theologian
Johann Balthasar König (1691–1758), German composer
Johann Samuel König (1712–1757), German mathematician
Johann Gerhard König (1728–1785), German botanist active in India
Johann König (gymnast) (born 1932), Austrian gymnast
Johann König (art dealer) (born 1981), German art dealer
John Koenig (diplomat), American diplomat
John Koenig, the creator of The Dictionary of Obscure Sorrows
Joseph König (theologian) (1819–1900), German theologian
Joseph König (chemist) (1843–1930), German chemist
Juan Ramón Koenig (1623–1709) Peruvian scientist
Julian Koenig (1921–2014), American advertising executive
Karl König (1902–1966), Austrian paediatrician
Kip Koenig, American film and television producer and screenwriter
Laird Koenig (born 1927), American author
Lea Koenig (born 1929), Israeli actor
Leo von König (1871–1944), German painter
Leopold König (born 1987), Czech road cyclist
Lothar Koenigs (born 1965), German conductor
Mark Koenig (1904–1993), American baseball player
Marie-Pierre Kœnig (1898–1970), French army officer and politician
Miroslav König (born 1972), Slovak football player
Morris Koenig (1883–1939), Hungarian-American lawyer and judge

N to Z
Oliver Koenig (born 1981), German athlete
Ove König (1950–2020), Swedish speed skater
Paul König (1867–1933), German merchant navy officer
Paul König (Scouting)
Peter Konig
Pia König (born 1993), Austrian tennis player
Pierre Koenig (1925–2004), American architect
Ralf König (born 1960), German comic artist
Regina König, German luger
René König (1906–1992), German sociologist
Robbie Koenig (born 1971), South African tennis player and broadcaster
Robert Koenig (sculptor) (born 1961), British sculptor
Robert Koenig (filmmaker) (born 1975), American film director, producer, writer and editor
Robert König (1885–1979), Austrian mathematician
Ronny König (born 1983), German football player
Rudolph Koenig (1832–1901), German acoustical physicist
Rudolf König (1865–1927), Austrian merchant, astronomer and selenographer
Samuel S. Koenig (1872–1955), Hungarian-American lawyer and politician
Sarah Koenig (born 1969), American journalist
Stephanie Koenig, American actress and writer
Sven Koenig (computer scientist), German-American computer scientist
Sven Koenig (cricketer) (born 1973), South African cricketer
Swen König (born 1985), Swiss football player
Todd Koenig (born 1985), American football player
Trevor Koenig (born 1974), Canadian ice hockey player
Vroni König-Salmi (born 1969), Swiss orienteerer
Walter Koenig (born 1936), American actor
William Edward Koenig (born 1956), American Catholic bishop
Wolf Koenig (1927–2014), German-Canadian film director, producer, animator and cinematographer
Xavier Koenig (born 1984), Mauritian squash player

Fictional people 
Tolle Koenig, a fictional character in the anime Gundam SEED
Eric Koenig, character in the Marvel Comics Universe
Erwin König (died 1942), apocryphal World War II German sniper
John Koenig (Space: 1999), a fictional character in the TV series Space: 1999
Karin Koenig, from the video game Shadow Hearts: Covenant
Mr. Koenig the high school Drama teacher, from the cut-for-time SNL sketch, played by Will Ferrell

See also
King (surname)

References 

German-language surnames
Surnames of German origin
Surnames from nicknames